The Sèvre Niortaise is a  long river in the Nouvelle-Aquitaine and Pays de la Loire regions in western France, flowing into the Atlantic Ocean. Its source is in the Deux-Sèvres department, near Sepvret, north of Melle.

It flows through the following departments and towns:

Deux-Sèvres: Saint-Maixent-l'École, Niort
Vendée: Damvix
Charente-Maritime: Marans

It flows into the Atlantic Ocean in Bourg-Chapon, north of the city of La Rochelle. The largest city along the river is Niort, which gives it the name Sèvre Niortaise, distinguishing it from the Sèvre Nantaise. Its largest tributaries are the Vendée and the Autise.

References

0Sevre Niortaise
Rivers of France
Rivers of Nouvelle-Aquitaine
Rivers of Pays de la Loire
Rivers of Deux-Sèvres
Rivers of Vendée
Rivers of Charente-Maritime